Tetratheca pilata is a species of plant in the quandong family that is endemic to Australia.

Description
The species grows as a small multistemmed shrub to 20–30 cm in height, with pale pink flowers.

Distribution and habitat
The range of the species lies within the Esperance Plains IBRA bioregion of south-west Western Australia in a small area south of the town of Ongerup. The plants grow on rocky outcrops with granitic loam soils.

References

pilata
Eudicots of Western Australia
Oxalidales of Australia
Plants described in 2007